The 6th Battalion, (Fort Garrys) CEF was a battalion of the Canadian Expeditionary Force during the First World War.

History 
The battalion was authorized on 10 August 1914, and embarked for Britain on 29 September 1914. It formed the nucleus of the Remount Depot on 20 January 1915, and the remainder of the battalion's personnel were absorbed by the Canadian Cavalry Depot, CEF, on 6 March 1915 to provide reinforcements for the Canadian Corps in the field. The battalion was disbanded on 5 April 1918.

The band of the 106th Regiment Winnipeg Light Infantry received permission to go overseas with the battalion, and in January 1915 transferred to the 10th Battalion, CEF.

The battalion recruited in Portage la Prairie, Roblin, Pipestone and Winnipeg, Manitoba; Lloydminster, Saskatchewan; and Pincher Creek, Alberta and was mobilized at Camp Valcartier, Quebec. Most of the recruits would come from detachments from at least 6 different cavalry militia regiments from across Western Canada: the 34th Fort Garry Horse, the 20th Border Horse, the 18th Manitoba Mounted Rifles, the 32nd Manitoba Horse, the 15th Canadian Light Horse from Alberta, and the 22nd Saskatchewan Light Horse.

The 6th Battalion was commanded by Lt.-Col. J.G. Rattray and by Lt.-Col R.W. Paterson.

Perpetuations 
The 6th Battalion, CEF was first perpetuated by The Border Horse.

In 1936, The Border Horse was Amalgamated with the 12th Manitoba Dragoons and the Perpetuation passed to that regiment. The 12th Manitoba Dragoons are currently on the Supplementary Order of Battle.

Battle honours 
The battalion was awarded the following battle honours

 Ypres 1915, '17
 Festubert, 1915
 Mount Sorrel
 Somme, 1916
 THE GREAT WAR, 1914-15.

See also 

 List of infantry battalions in the Canadian Expeditionary Force

References

Sources
Canadian Expeditionary Force 1914-1919 by Col G.W.L. Nicholson, CD, Queens's Printer, Ottawa, Ontario, 1962

006
Military units and formations of Manitoba
Military units and formations of Alberta
Military units and formations of Saskatchewan
12th Manitoba Dragoons